Charles Jones (born August 5, 1996) is an American football tight end for the New Jersey Generals of the United States Football League (USFL). He played college football at Tulane.

Early years 
Jones attended St. Augustine High School in New Orleans. In high school, he was teammates with Leonard Fournette.

College career 
Jones played college football at Tulane. During his time for the Green Wave, he appeared in 40 games with 22 starts, and totaled 40 receptions for 268 yards and five touchdowns.

Professional career

Jacksonville Jaguars
After going undrafted in the 2019 NFL Draft, Jones was signed by the Jacksonville Jaguars. He was waived on August 31, 2019, and was signed to the practice squad the next day. He was promoted to the active roster on November 18, 2019.

Jones was placed on the reserve/COVID-19 list by the Jaguars on July 30, 2020. He was activated from the list on the morning of August 2, 2020, but was re-added to the list later that day. He was activated from the list again on August 7. He was waived/injured on August 22, 2020, and subsequently reverted to the team's injured reserve list the next day. He was waived from injured reserve with an injury settlement on September 1, 2020.

Buffalo Bills
On October 28, 2020, Jones was signed to the Buffalo Bills practice squad, but was released three days later.

Pittsburgh Steelers
On November 17, 2020, the Pittsburgh Steelers signed Jones to their practice squad. He signed a reserve/future contract on January 21, 2021. He was waived on May 3.

New Jersey Generals
Jones signed with the New Jersey Generals of the USFL on January 11, 2023.

References

External links 
 Jacksonville Jaguars bio
 Tulane Green Wave bio

1996 births
Living people
American football tight ends
Tulane Green Wave football players
Jacksonville Jaguars players
Players of American football from New Orleans
Buffalo Bills players
Pittsburgh Steelers players
New Jersey Generals (2022) players